Janet Grey (born February 3, 1952) is an actress who is remembered for having played Eve Stapleton McFarren on the CBS soap opera Guiding Light from 1976 to 1982

Joining the cast in early 1976 as the younger sister and confidante of Guiding Light heroine Rita Stapleton, Grey's character eventually became involved in a number of her own storylines, including the loss of her character's eyesight after a fall (she would later undergo risky surgery and regain her sight), and a popular romantic triangle with characters Ben McFarren and Amanda Wexler Spaulding.  Though still popular characters into the early 1980s, Ben and Eve were written out late 1982, when the soap decided to retool its cast and focus in a more youth-oriented direction.

Since leaving Guiding Light, Grey has largely left acting.

External links

American soap opera actresses
1952 births
Living people
21st-century American women